Richard Pennefather Rothwell (May 1, 1836 – April 17, 1901) was a Canadian-American civil, mechanical and mining engineer. He was the co-founder of the American Institute of Mining Engineers, and was awarded the gold medal at the Paris Exposition, in 1898, by the Soeiete d'Encouragement pour l'Industrie Nationale de France, as founder and editor of The Mineral Industry.

Early years and education
Richard Pennefather Rothwell was born May 1, 1836, at Ingersoll, Ontario, Canada. He studied in early life at Trinity College, Toronto, the Rensselaer Institute at Troy, New York, and the École nationale supérieure des mines de Paris.

Career
His professional practice in France and England, and his subsequent career as civil, mechanical and mining engineer in Pennsylvania, from the year 1866 to 1873, prepared him for his later work as editor, writer and manager of statistical and scientific publications. Rothwell already was known as an accomplished writer on engineering and mining topics when, in 1874 he became an editor, and afterward the owner of The Engineering and Mining Journal. 

Later, he formed The Scientific Publishing Company, and in 1893, began the publication of The Mineral Industry, which fulfilled his  ideal of an annual that would cover the whole field of the world's mineral production and the world's mining and metallurgical progress. Rothwell was eminently fitted to organize and advance this undertaking. He possessed a quick perception of the value of material for publication, an extraordinary memory and a keen sense of fitness and preparation. While he possessed in an eminent degree the power of broad generalization, few men could analyze a compilation of figures so quickly or give to statistical results so clear and compact a form. He laid the lines on which The Mineral Industry had been carried forward, and it was primarily due to his good judgment and management that the book from the first possessed a value, which was generally acknowledged as scarcely without parallel in statistical and technical literature.

Rothwell was one of the three founders of the American Institute of Mining Engineers. He was awarded the gold medal at the Paris Exposition, in 1898, by the Soeiete d'Encouragement pour l'Industrie Nationale de France, as editor of The Mineral Industry. 

Personal life
Rothwell married Bertha Hillebrand in 1862.

He died at his residence in New York City, on April 17, 1901.

References

Bibliography
 
 

1836 births
1901 deaths
People from Ingersoll, Ontario
Canadian civil engineers
Canadian mechanical engineers
Canadian mining engineers
Canadian publishers (people)
Trinity College (Canada) alumni
Rensselaer Polytechnic Institute alumni
Mines Paris - PSL alumni